Last House on Dead End Street, originally released as The Fun House, is a 1977 American exploitation horror film written, produced, and directed by Roger Watkins, under the pseudonym Victor Janos. The plot follows a disgruntled ex-convict (also played by Watkins) who takes revenge on society by kidnapping four acquaintances and filming their murders in an abandoned building.

Watkins, a student at the State University of New York at Oneonta, devised the concept for the film after reading the Charles Manson biography The Family (1971) by Ed Sanders. Commissioning a cast from the university's theater department, Watkins shot the film inside an unused building on the university campus in the winter of 1972, on a budget of around $3,000.

Screened under the title The Cuckoo Clocks of Hell at the 1973 Cannes and Berlin Film Festivals, Watkins's original cut of the film (now lost) ran approximately three hours in length. A truncated version of the film was released theatrically in 1977 under the title The Fun House. In 1979, Cinematic Releasing Corporation acquired distribution rights to the film and re-released it under the title Last House on Dead End Street, capitalizing on the popularity of Wes Craven's The Last House on the Left.

In the decades following its release, Last House on Dead End Street was subject to various rumors about who had created and starred in it, as the entire cast and crew were credited using pseudonyms. This resulted in speculation that the film might have depicted actual murders. In 2000, Watkins publicly came forward and confirmed himself as the director, writer, and lead actor. Two years later, the film was released for the first time on DVD, through participation from Watkins, and with the actual names of the actors revealed. The film has continued to be a point of discussion among film scholars, largely due to its metafilmic qualities, surrealist imagery, and themes surrounding the aestheticization of violence in cinema.

Plot 
Terry Hawkins has just been released from prison after spending a year incarcerated for drug charges. An amateur filmmaker, Terry claims to have previously made stag films that he was unable to sell. Convinced that modern audiences crave more extreme content, Terry decides to make a real snuff film. After choosing a large abandoned college as the setting of his film, Terry secures financing from an unsuspecting film company run by an openly gay film executive named Steve Randall. Terry rounds up a group of disparate women and men— some of them amateur filmmakers— who are willing to help make his film. Among them are filmmaker Bill Drexel; untrained actresses Kathy and her friend Patricia; and Ken, one of Terry's longtime acquaintances and a former pornographic actor.

For their first scene, Patricia and Kathy, wearing translucent plastic masks, lure a blind transient to the building. The women fondle him before Terry, donning a Greek tragedy-like mask, strangles the man to death while Bill films the murder. Meanwhile, pornographic director Jim Palmer, a peer of Steve's, waits anxiously for a party he is attending to end; his wife Nancy, done up in blackface, is whipped repeatedly in front of party guests as part of a sex game. Jim complains to Steve that people's tastes are becoming "hard to satisfy." The next day, Terry arrives at Jim and Nancy's home, and finds Nancy alone. He introduces himself as a mutual friend of Ken, with whom Nancy has previously appeared in adult films. Terry quickly seduces Nancy before showing her the footage of the blind man's murder in an attempt to convince her to ask Jim if he will invest in the picture. She is shocked by how realistic the footage looks; Terry confesses that it is in fact real, and rapes her.

The following morning, Terry calls Steve and asks him to stop by the building to visit the film set; he also inquires about a young actress named Suzie Knowles for a part in his movie. Steve arrives later that night, and is confronted by Terry and his crew inside the building, all of them wearing masks. Steve is knocked unconscious, and awakens to find himself tied up alongside Nancy and Suzie. Terry and his crew brand Suzie across her chest with a hot iron before Terry slashes her throat. Later, Terry goes to meet Jim at his office and kidnaps him. Back at the building, Terry and his crew beat Jim to death while Bill again films the crime. They then take an unconscious Nancy and tie her to a large dining table. She awakens to Bill filming her, while Terry uses a hacksaw to dismember her legs before they eviscerate her with gardening shears. During the mutilation, they periodically revive her consciousness with the aid of smelling salts before she bleeds to death.

Terry and his crew confront Steve with the corpse of the blind transient they killed earlier, and welcome him "back to the edge." Steve flees through the building, and is confronted in the basement by Terry, who tackles him to the ground. Bill emerges from a dark corridor with his camera while Kathy and Patricia taunt Steve. Patricia removes her mask and takes off her blouse, exposing her breasts. She unbuttons her pants, revealing a dismembered goat hoof she has held between her legs. As the group taunt Steve, Terry forces him to fellate the goat hoof. Steve escapes, but is cornered in an empty room, where a row of spotlights suddenly light up. Terry and his crew, armed with a power drill, approach Steve, plunging the drill bit through his eye socket, killing him. One by one, they slowly back away from Steve's body and disappear into the darkness.

As the scene fades out, a voiceover states that Terry, Bill, Ken, Patricia, and Kathy were apprehended and are in a state penitentiary.

Cast

Analysis
Some film scholars have noted Last House on Dead End Streets unique preoccupation with and self-reflexivity regarding the aestheticization of violence. In Holy Terror: Understanding Religion and Violence in Popular Culture (2010), film scholars Gerry Carlin and Mark Jones point out the film's similarities to the Manson family murders, and note its religious undertones, which are amplified by the film's choral soundtrack: "Though principally a metafilmic commentary on cinematic perversity, the [lead character]'s gnomic pronouncements, and the excessively ritualized evisceral 'sacrifices' allude to a debased if fundamentally unrepresentable religiosity." Horror film critic and scholar Chas Balun echoes a similar sentiment, writing in 1989 that, "Last House on Dead End Street proves especially unsettling in the manner in which it blurs the lines between recording, inciting and participating in an act of violence. Other films...  have similarly broached the subject, but none have been so alarmingly forthright and worrisome."

Film scholars Bill Landis and Michelle Clifford described the film as sticking to "a consistent, purposeful style that builds to the foulest mood imaginable, creating its own world of hate. In that unintentional exploitation way, it reproduces the Panic Theater extremes of surrealism, where evisceration is the metaphor for the sex act," likening it to the "bastard cousin of Otto Muehl." Landis and Clifford also note the self-reflexive framing of the film, deeming it "a film within a film motivated by a hate of pornography and the swingers who create it." Because of Terry's focus on murdering individuals connected to the pornographic film industry, Landis and Clifford herald the film as "the ultimate sexual revenge movie...  What goes around comes around in the underground porno world, and Terry Hawkins makes this code his law, filming his targets as they take their last undignified breaths."

Production
Concept and filming

Last House on Dead End Street was conceived by Roger Watkins, a student at the State University of New York at Oneonta (SUNY Oneonta), in 1972. Watkins was inspired to write the screenplay after reading the Charles Manson biography The Family (1971) by Ed Sanders, which focused on the Manson family murders in Southern California. The project was initially conceived as a straightforward biopic about the Manson family, but morphed into a feature about a disgruntled ex-convict who decides to make snuff films with a group of degenerates. Though Watkins was studying English literature, he became interested in filmmaking, and befriended several students in the university's film department. Through events sponsored by the film department, Watkins was able to meet directors Otto Preminger and Nicholas Ray, both of whom he idolized. Preminger took a liking to Watkins, and gifted him a Bolex camera, which Watkins used to film the simulated snuff footage featured in Last House on Dead End Street.

In casting the film, Watkins chose to star as Terry, the ringleader of the snuff filmmakers, and commissioned a cast exclusively consisting of current or former students of the theater department at SUNY Oneonta. The film was shot in December 1972 in an abandoned building on the university campus known as Old Main. The building, derelict at the time, was demolished in 1977. Watkins would later reveal that, at the time of the making the film, he was an amphetamine addict, and that only $800 of the $3,000 budget was actually spent on making the film; the remaining $2,200 was used to purchase drugs. The film's working title was And at the Hour of our Death.

Musical score
Due to budget constraints, the majority of the film's score and audio effects were sourced from composer and ethnomusicologist David Fanshawe, via KPM Musichouse audio library. In additional to Moog synthesizer pieces, the musical score incorporates Gregorian chants among other ambient noises. The film's original musical score was released for the first time on vinyl February 12, 2016 by the independent labels Vombis and Light in the Attic.Track listing'''

Release
The original 175-minute version of the film was titled The Cuckoo Clocks of Hell, inspired by a quote in the Kurt Vonnegut novel Mother Night (1962). The film was screened under this title at the Cannes Film Festival on May 1, 1973, followed by the Berlin International Film Festival on July 14. Watkins alleged that the film caused riots when subsequently shown in New York City and Chicago; it was apocryphally claimed that a theater in Chicago was burned down in a riot that occurred during a screening. This version has been lost, with the original negatives either destroyed or missing. Subsequent theatrical distribution was delayed after one of the actresses sued Watkins, worried that a nude scene in the film would impede her chances of finding success as a Broadway actress.

In May 1977, the film was released in a truncated cut as The Fun House, screening at drive-in theaters throughout Connecticut, as well as in Shreveport, Louisiana, and Millville, New Jersey. It subsequently screened at a drive-in in Ithaca, New York beginning June 3, 1977, paired as a double feature with Mark of the Devil. Independent film distributor Cinematic Releasing Corporation subsequently acquired rights to the film and had re-released it as early as March 1979 (Miami, Florida) under the title Last House on Dead End Street, a play on the title of the Wes Craven film The Last House on the Left (1972). It opened in New York City under this title on December 28, 1979. Vernacular historian Bill Landis note that, during the film's New York screenings—which occurred primarily in grindhouse theaters in Times Square—"people on the Deuce sat stunned and sickened, but unable to leave their seats." In the United Kingdom, the film was banned by the British Board of Film Classification; Tobe Hooper's slasher film The Funhouse (1981) was also banned by association, as the films had almost identical titles.

For over two decades following the film's theatrical release, the true identities of the director and cast were unknown to the public, as the names given in the credits were pseudonyms. This sparked various rumors surrounding the film, the most well-known being that it had emerged from underground cinema circles in New York, and featured footage of actual murders. In his 1995 book Killing for Culture, David Kerekes stated: "Any attempt to trace the names behind Last House on Dead End Street will lead no further than the credits themselves, all obviously false." However, Chas Balun's 1989 review had in fact identified the film's director as "a young New York film student named Roger Watkins."

In December 2000, a contributor posting as "pnest" on the Internet messageboards of FAB Press (a publishing house devoted to cult movies), claimed to be the director, writer, producer,  and editor of the film, "Victor Janos." The poster later revealed his identity as Roger Watkins. After the release of Last House on Dead End Street, Watkins had had a career as a pornographic film director, under the pseudonym Richard Mahler.

Critical response
AllMovie wrote, "This notorious exercise in low-budget gore is poorly edited and photographed, but its catalogue of horrors and a genuinely nasty tone make it worthwhile for fans of sick cinema," drawing comparisons to the Manson family killings. Eric Campos of Film Threat wrote, "It's not only the intense gore contained within these 78 minutes that has led many to label this film as the most vile ever made, but it's also the drab, dreary settings and the assortment of malcontents you're forced to put up with if you want to make it to the other end of this ride. Nothing that has to do with this film is happy or light and the film itself, even though presented nice and clear on this DVD, appears to be covered in dirt." Anton Bitel, writing for Film4, called the film "dirt cheap and deeply flawed, but still worth enduring, for even if the deaths are faked, there's a real enough intelligence behind it all."

In Slimetime: A Guide to Sleazy, Mindless Movies, Steve Puchalski wrote that the film is "harsh, repellent, and thoroughly unlikeable. It's effective much in the same way a large mallet to the temple is effective, but that doesn't mean it's any fun to sit through." Michael Weldon, in the Psychotronic Encyclopedia, similarly notes: "Have you ever heard anyone even admit they saw it? I wish I couldn't." Scholars Bill Landis and Michelle Clifford describe the sequence in which Nancy is dismembered alive as "one of the most revolting scenes in exploitation history...  guaranteed to reduce even the most jaded viewers to quivering disgust." Critic Chas Balun wrote that the film "delivers a mule kick to the old nugget sack with a loathsome, virulent fury." Aside from the postscript describing the killers' incarceration after the murders, Balun states that the film "shows absolutely no moral equilibrium whatsoever." Writer Stephen Thrower similarly suggests that the film possesses "a forbidding, hostile vibe, a malignant radiation that sends your toxicity meter haywire...  What gives it unique status is the aura of pure hatred that oozes out of every pore of the project."TV Guide was highly critical of the film, writing "This vain attempt to combine splatter with a commentary on the viciousness of the movie business fails miserably on all counts." Alternately, Jay Alan of HorrorNews.net gave the film a favorable review. While admitting the film looked cheaply made, and featured poor audio and dubbing; Alan commended the film's gore effects, decent acting, disturbing atmosphere and tone, writing, "While it may not neighbor to the caliber of Last House on the Left, it is truly a house worth at least visiting at least once".

Home mediaLast House on Dead End Street was scarcely released on VHS in the United States, and was made available on video through Venezuelan distributors in the late 1980s and early 1990s. A two-disc DVD set of the film was released in 2002 by Barrel Entertainment. The set features major contributions from director Watkins, who was heavily involved in its production. This edition was also released in Australia through Hard Corps Entertainment. A separate Region 2 DVD edition was released in the United Kingdom as part Tartan Films' Grindhouse series.

In a 2015 interview with Joe Rubin, the co-owner of the cult DVD and Blu-ray label Vinegar Syndrome, he stated that the company was preparing a restored Blu-ray release of the film.

Though there has been no update about a standalone Vinegar Syndrome release, the uncut theatrical version of the film is available in 2K HD as a hidden feature on Vinegar Syndrome’s release of Corruption'' on Blu-ray.

See also
 List of American films of 1973
Snuff films
Exploitation films
List of incomplete or partially lost films

Notes

References

Sources

External links 
 
 
 
 

1977 films
1977 horror films
1973 films
1973 horror films
1970s avant-garde and experimental films
1970s lost films
1973 independent films
1977 independent films
American exploitation films
American films about revenge
American independent films
American splatter films
1970s exploitation films
Films set in abandoned houses
Films shot in New York (state)
Obscenity controversies in film
Films about snuff films
Films directed by Roger Watkins
1970s English-language films
1970s American films
Art works that caused riots
Films originally rejected by the British Board of Film Classification